Galileo Games is a role-playing games publisher, best known for its games Bulldogs!, Mortal Coil, and How We Came To Live Here. It is the publishing imprint of Brennan Taylor, who is also the CEO of Indie Press Revolution.

See also
Indie Press Revolution

External links

Role-playing game publishing companies